Delta lepeleterii is a species of potter wasp from Angola, Botswana, Burkina Faso, Democratic Republic of Congo, Eritrea, Ethiopia, Kenya, Mali, Mozambique, Namibia, Niger, Nigeria, Senegal, Socotra, Somalia, South Africa, Sudan, Tanzania (Tanzania, Zanzibar).

References

External links
 
 

Potter wasps
Insects described in 1852